Nancy Haynes (born 1947) is an artist living and working in New York. She was born in Connecticut and shares her time between living in New York City and the Huerfano Valley in Colorado.

Paintings 
Haynes is a conceptual artist. Her art-historical influences cite Marcel Duchamp, Mondrian, Dan Flavin, On Kawara and Ad Reinhardt, but as Marjorie Welish noted in her essay, “Nancy Haynes, A Literature of Silence”, Haynes’ also has influences from literature. Welish states: 
“Nancy Haynes has produced a series of breath-taking monotypes inspired by the work of Samuel Beckett. That her admiration for him is long-standing comes as no surprise to those viewers familiar with her painting. She is aesthetically in accord with Beckett's assumption of "the divine aphasia," or speechlessness, against which mark-making is inadequate (That Which Memory Cannot Locate, 1991-92). She evidently admires that same impulse toward (the Heideggarean) "inadequacy of language" in art other than her own (Robert Ryman's own homage to Beckett's, Ill Seen Ill Said, with its barely voiced "th" inscribed in illustration, for instance). Cognizant of Vladimir and Estragon's cosmic fretfulness, she conducts her own forays into elegant stuttering on the visual plane.”

In Haynes’ recent paintings, the canvases began to “evolve from a paler shade of a given pigment to a darker one, creating a horizontal movement that pulls the eye toward an unseen source of light.”

More notable works include her autobiographical color charts series (2005-2013), which employ swatches of color contained within grids, meant to give an autobiography of the artist.

Notable exhibitions 

Selected solo exhibitions

2000   Between Two Appearances, Stark Gallery, New York
2002   Galerie Hubert Winter, Vienna, Austria
2006   Galerie Hubert Winter, Vienna, Austria
2009   dissolution, Elizabeth Harris Gallery, New York
2010   “Selected Small Paintings“, George Lawson Gallery, San Francisco
2012   “Recent Paintings", George Lawson Gallery, Los Angeles

Awards
Haynes has been awarded by the Pollock-Krasner Foundation in 1995, The National Endowment for the Arts in 1987 and again in 1990, and the New York Foundation for the Arts in 1987.

Public collections 
Her work is in the public collections of the Metropolitan Museum of Art in New York, the Museum of Modern Art in New York, The Whitney Museum of American Art in New York, the Brooklyn Museum, the Hood Museum of Art in Dartmouth, NH, The Addison Gallery of American Art, Phillips Academy in Andover, MA, the Denver Art Museum, Haags Gemeentemuseum in The Hague, Holland, the National Gallery of Art in Washington, D.C., The Museum of Fine Arts in Houston, TX, The Ackland Museum, in Chapel Hill, NC, The Chrysler Museum of Art in Norfolk, VA, The Rose Art Museum at Bradeis University in Waltham, MA, The Fogg Art Museum at Harvard University in Cambridge, MA, The San Diego Museum of Art, The Davis Museum and Cultural Center at Wellesley College in Wellesley, MA and the UCLA Hammer Museum in Los Angeles, CA, among many others.

References

Further reading

External links 
Rachel Nackman on Nancy Haynes
Elizabeth Donato on Nancy Haynes
Overview of Nancy Haynes Work

Artists from Brooklyn
1947 births
Artists from Waterbury, Connecticut
Living people
American women artists
People from Red Hook, Brooklyn
21st-century American women